Poddubnoye is a rural locality (a selo) in Zhilinskoye Rural Settlement, Rossoshansky District, Voronezh Oblast, Russia. The population was 523 as of 2010. There are 10 streets.

Geography 
Poddubnoye is located 50 km southwest of Rossosh (the district's administrative centre) by road. Zhilino is the nearest rural locality.

References 

Rural localities in Rossoshansky District